Marc Laming, is a British illustrator and designer.

Laming began his career working for Fleetway Publications. Best known for his work on Marvel's Star Wars titles he also illustrated the five-part Planet Hulk miniseries that formed part of the 2015 Marvel Comics event "Secret Wars". His works include comic books for Fleetway Publications, DC/Vertigo, Marvel, IDW, Dynamite, Dark Horse, Image and Boom!Studios. He also has worked for television and animation projects, storyboard and visuals for record companies.

He lives at Hatfield, Herefordshire, England.

Bibliography
 Revolver (1990)
 Six Degrees  (1995)
 The Dreaming  (2000)
 Gyre  (1997)
 American Century (2001)
 The Sandman Presents: Taller Tales (2003)
 Robert E. Howard's Savage Sword (2010)
 Bad Doings and Big Ideas: A Bill Willingham Deluxe Edition (2011)
 The Activity  (2011)
 The Rinse  (2011)
 Exile On The Planet Of The Apes (2012)
 Grindhouse: Doors Open At Midnight (2013)
 Splinter Cell - Echoes (2013)
 Kings Watch (2013)
 All-New Invaders (2014)
 Fantastic Four (2014)
 Hulk (2014)
 In The Dark (2014)
 Tom Clancy's Splinter Cell: Echoes (2014)
 King: The Phantom  (2015)
 Marvel Free Previews Secret Wars (2015)
 Original Sin Companion (2015)
 Planet Hulk (2015)
Uncanny Avengers Annual (2016)
Ninjak (2016)
Star Wars The Force Awakens (2016)
Daredevil (2017)
Star Wars Doctor Aphra Annual (2017)
Wonder Woman Annual (2018)
Batwoman (2018)
Star Wars Annual (2018)
Star Wars: Beckett (2018)
James Bond 007 (2018–19)
Star Wars Age Of Rebellion: Grand Moff Tarkin (2019)
Star Wars Age Of Rebellion: Boba Fett (2019)
Target Vader (2019)

External links

Marc Laming at Marvel Comics
 
 
 Interview with Marc Laming

British comics artists
1968 births
Living people